The 1948 South Sydney was the 41st in the club's history. The club competed in the New South Wales Rugby Football League Premiership (NSWRFL), finishing the season 7th, missing the finals.

Ladder

Fixtures

Player statistics

References 

South Sydney Rabbitohs seasons
1948 in Australian rugby league